Cilliers Brink (born 12 June 1987) is a South African politician who served as the Democratic Alliance's Shadow Minister of Cooperative Governance and Traditional Affairs from 2020 until 2023 and as a Member of Parliament (MP) from 2019 to 2023. He was the party's Shadow Deputy Minister of Cooperative Governance and Traditional Affairs between 2019 and 2020. Brink was elected a DA councillor in Tshwane in 2011 and served as a member of the mayoral committee (MMC) between 2016 and 2019.

Education
Brink studied law at the University of Pretoria.

Political career
Brink has had an interest in politics since a young age. He joined the Democratic Alliance and was elected to the Tshwane city council in 2011. After the 2016 municipal elections, the DA gained control of Tshwane and Brink was appointed as the member of the mayoral committee for corporate and shared services, becoming the first DA politician to hold the post.

Parliamentary career 
Prior to the 2019 South African general election held on 8 May, the DA revealed their candidate lists. Brink was placed tenth on the party's Gauteng list of National Assembly candidates, thirty-third on the party's national candidate list for the National Assembly and sixty-seventh on the party's provincial list for the provincial legislature. He was elected to the National Assembly on the party's national list. Brink was sworn into office on 22 May 2019.

On 5 June 2019, he was appointed Shadow Deputy Minister of Cooperative Governance and Traditional Affairs. Brink became a member of the  Portfolio Committee on Cooperative Governance and Traditional Affairs on 27 June 2019.

In June 2020, Brink criticised the national Minister of Cooperative Governance and Traditional Affairs, Dr. Nkosazana Dlamini-Zuma, for saying that municipalities should appoint "the right cadres for the job". He went on to claim that cadre deployment is responsible for the decline of municipalities and that cadre deployment should be abolished.

On 5 December 2020, he was appointed as Shadow Minister for the portfolio, succeeding Haniff Hoosen, in the Shadow Cabinet of John Steenhuisen.

Tshwane mayoral candidacy 
Tshwane mayor and DA member Randall Williams announced his resignation as mayor on 13 February 2023. Brink and seven other DA members were interviewed for the position; he was announced as the DA's candidate on 21 February 2023 and his candidacy was endorsed by the members of the multi-party coalition which held a majority of seats on the Tshwane city council. He became a councillor on 23 February 2023 after councillor Sean Cox resigned to make way for him to be sworn in. During the council meeting on 28 February 2023, Brink lost to council speaker and COPE's lone councillor, Dr Murunwa Makwarela in the election for mayor. Brink received only 101 votes compared to Makwarela's 112.

References

External links
Mr Cilliers Brink at Parliament of South Africa

Living people
1987 births
Afrikaner people
People from Pretoria
Democratic Alliance (South Africa) politicians
Members of the National Assembly of South Africa